I-73 was an Imperial Japanese Navy Kaidai type cruiser submarine of the KD6A sub-class commissioned in 1937 that served during World War II.  One month after participating in the Japanese attack on Pearl Harbor, she was sunk by the United States Navy submarine  in January 1942.

Design and description
The submarines of the KD6A sub-class were versions of the preceding KD5 sub-class with greater surface speed and diving depth. They displaced  surfaced and  submerged. The boats had a diving depth of 

For surface running, the submarines were powered by two  diesel engines, each driving one propeller shaft. When submerged each propeller was driven by a  electric motor. They could reach  on the surface and  underwater.

The submarines were armed with six internal  torpedo tubes, four in the bow and two in the stern. They carried a total of 14 torpedoes. They also were armed with one  deck gun and a  anti-aircraft machinegun.

Construction and commissioning
One of the vessels constructed as part of Japan's 1st Naval Armaments Supplement Programme in 1931, I-73 was laid down on either 5 April or 5 November 1934 (according to different sources) at the Kawasaki Shipyard in Kobe, Japan. Both launched and numbered I-73 on 20 June 1935, she was completed and commissioned on 7 January 1937.

Service history

Pre-World War II
On the day of her commissioning, I-73 was attached to the Kure Naval District and assigned to Submarine Division 20. Her division was assigned to Submarine Squadron 2 in the 2nd Fleet, a component of the Combined Fleet, on 1 December 1937, and then to  Submarine Squadron 3 in the 2nd Fleet on 15 November 1939. I-73 departed Okinawa on 27 March 1940 in company with the submarines I-68, I-74, and I-75 for a training cruise in southern Chinese waters, completing it when the six submarines arrived at Takao, Formosa, on 2 April 1940. On 15 November 1940, Submarine Squadron 3 was reassigned to the 6th Fleet, another component of the Combined Fleet. On 16 January 1941, the submarine I-72 temporarily relieved I-73 as flagship of Submarine Division 20.

On 11 November 1941, I-73 was assigned to the 6th Fleet′s Advance Force. That day, the 6th Fleet's commander, Vice Admiral Mitsumi Shimizu, held a meeting with the commanding officers of the submarines of Submarine Squadron 3 aboard his flagship, the light cruiser , and his chief of staff briefed them on plans for Operation Z, the upcoming surprise attack on Pearl Harbor in Hawaii. The attack would begin the Pacific campaign and bring Japan and the United States into World War II.

As Japanese military forces began to deploy for the opening Japanese offensive of the war, I-73 — with the commander of Submarine Division 20 embarked — departed Saeki Bay on the coast of Kyushu on 11 November 1941 in company with the submarines , I-68, I-69, I-71, and I-72 bound for Kwajalein Atoll, which she reached on 20 November 1941. Assigned to support Operation Z, I-73 got underway from Kwajalein on 23 November 1941, again with the commander of Submarine Division 20 embarked, and set course for the Hawaiian Islands. While she was en route, she received the message "Climb Mount Niitaka 1208" from the Combined Fleet on 2 December 1941, indicating that war with the Allies would commence on 8 December 1941 Japan time, which was on 7 December 1941 on the other side of the International Date Line in Hawaii. After reaching Hawaiian waters, she conducted a reconnaissance of Kealaikahiki Channel between Kahoolawe and Lanai on 5 December 1941 and of Lahaina Roads off Maui after sunset on 6 December 1941.

World War II

First war patrol
By 7 December 1941, the day of the Pearl Harbor attack, Submarine Squadron 3 was deployed south of Oahu, ordered to reconnoiter the area and attack any American ships that sortied from Pearl Harbor. As part of this deployment, I-73 was stationed off the entrance to Pearl Harbor. Her time off Oahu passed uneventfully, and on 17 December 1941 she departed Hawaiian waters to make for Kwajalein. 

Along the way, I-73 was diverted from her voyage to bombard Johnston Atoll. She arrived off the atoll on 23 December 1941 and fired six  rounds, knocking down the Civil Aeronautics Authority homing tower on Sand Islet, wounding one United States Marine, and later claiming a hit on a utility pole. The United States Marine Corps  gun battery on Johnston Island returned fire, each of its guns firing ten rounds before I-73 submerged and departed the area unharmed. She arrived at Kwajalein on 29 December 1941.

Second war patrol

I-73 transmitted a situation report from her assigned patrol area on 15 January 1942. She often is credited incorrectly with shelling Midway Atoll on 25 January 1942, but I-24 conducted that bombardment.

Loss

She steered to intercept them, but did not encounter them. While submerged and searching for them, however, she detected the sound of high-speed propellers off her port bow at 09:00 local time. One minute and 45 seconds after firing the torpedoes, Gudgeon′s crew heard two explosions, after which I-73′s propeller noises stopped. Gudgeon returned to periscope depth and saw no sign of I-73. She claimed only to have damaged I-73, but Station HYPO, a U.S. Navy signals intelligence unit in Hawaii, confirmed that Gudgeon had sunk I-73.

The Imperial Japanese Navy declared I-73 to be presumed lost with all 94 hands off Hawaii and on 10 March 1942 administratively transferred her to the fourth reserve at Kure Japan, pending final disposition. The Japanese removed her from the Navy list on 15 March 1942.

References

Footnotes

Bibliography
 

Kaidai-class submarines
Ships built by Kawasaki Heavy Industries
World War II submarines of Japan
Attack on Pearl Harbor
Japanese submarines lost during World War II
1935 ships
Ships lost with all hands
Ships sunk by American submarines
Maritime incidents in January 1942
Submarines sunk by submarines
World War II shipwrecks in the Pacific Ocean